Villiersicus longicornis is a species of beetle in the family Cerambycidae. It was described by Vives in 2005.

References

Dorcasominae
Beetles described in 2005